Mitsuhama (三津浜), formerly also known as Mitsugahama, is the main port of Matsuyama, Ehime, Japan.

In October, 1888, the Iyotetsu light railway line connecting Mitsuhama with Matsuyama began operation.

Mitsuhama absorbed the village of Furumitsu in 1925 and Shinhama in 1937. In 1940 Mitsuhama was merged into the city of Matsuyama.

Dissolved municipalities of Ehime Prefecture
Matsuyama, Ehime